The KJ Choi Invitational is a golf tournament on the Korean Tour. It was co-sanctioned by the Asian Tour from 2011 to 2013. It was played for the first time in October 2011 at the Haesley Nine Bridges Golf Club in Yeoju, South Korea. The tournament is hosted by South Korean golfer K. J. Choi, who also won the first two events. The purse in 2018 was ₩1,000,000,000.

Winners

Notes

External links
Coverage on the Asian Tour's official site

Korean Tour events
Former Asian Tour events
Golf tournaments in South Korea
Recurring sporting events established in 2011